Daniele Rocco (born 27 December 1998) is an Italian footballer who plays as a forward for Serie D club Caronnese.

Club career
Rocco was born in Magenta. His first professional team was Serie C side Reggiana, he made his professional debut in the 2017–18 season, on 2 December 2017 against AlbinoLeffe, coming in as a substitute for Alessandro Cesarini in the 84th minute. He signed to Alessandria on 3 August 2018.

On 6 September 2019, his contract with Alessandria was dissolved by mutual consent.

References

Sources
 
 

1998 births
Living people
People from Magenta, Lombardy
Footballers from Lombardy
Association football forwards
Italian footballers
A.C. Reggiana 1919 players
U.S. Alessandria Calcio 1912 players
Serie C players
Serie D players
S.C. Caronnese S.S.D. players
Sportspeople from the Metropolitan City of Milan